Borstel may refer to the following places in Germany:

Borstel, Lower Saxony, in the district of Diepholz, Lower Saxony
Borstel (Neustadt am Rübenberge), part of Neustadt am Rübenberge, Lower Saxony
Borstel, Schleswig-Holstein, in the district of Segeberg, Schleswig-Holstein
Borstel-Hohenraden, in the district of Pinneberg, Schleswig-Holstein